= Mustafa Zarti =

Former vice chairman of Libya's sovereign wealth fund

Mustafa Mohamed Zarti (born 1970) was vice chairman of Libya's $65 billion sovereign wealth fund.
